Kikkeri is a small town in  Krishnarajapete, Mandya district of Karnataka state, India.

Schools in Kikkeri
 Karnataka Public School, Kikkeri
 Cambridge Public School, Kikkeri

People from Kikkeri
 K. S. Narasimhaswamy, an Indian poet in the Kannada language.
 K. S. L. Swamy, a renowned film maker in the Kannada Film Industry.

See also 
 Brahmeshvara Temple, Kikkeri
 Dabbeghatta
 Govindanahalli
 Holenarasipura
 Mandagere
 Panchalingeshwara Temple, Govindanahalli
 Sasalu, Mandya

References

Villages in Mandya district